Joelton is an unincorporated community in Davidson and Cheatham counties in the U.S. state of Tennessee. The portion of Joelton in Davidson County is governed by the Metropolitan Council of Nashville and Davidson County, due to the fact that the government of Davidson County is consolidated with that of Nashville. All of Joelton is included in the Nashville metropolitan area.

Geography
Joelton is primarily in the northwestern portion of Davidson County along Interstate 24 (Exit 35) and junctions with U.S. Route 431, but parts of Joelton bordering Exit 31 of Interstate 24 lie in Cheatham County. Governmentally, most of Joelton is in Metropolitan Nashville - Davidson County, but it retains a separate identity as a community. Joelton is located on the edge of the Western Highland Rim a few miles from where the Nashville Basin begins. The terrain in and around the community is very rugged, with steep rolling hills where bedrock is located close to the surface. Joelton is a semi-rural community of farms and suburban neighborhoods 25 minutes northwest of Nashville. Despite the rapid growth of the Nashville metropolitan area, the area where Joelton is located has remained predominantly rural.
The total 2014 population is 8,189, the population has increased by 14 percent since 2000.

History
According to the NashvilleNext report compiled by Metro Nashville government: "Joelton was settled principally by German, Scots-Irish, and Italian immigrants. Agriculture through small family farms on fertile lands and subsistence farming in the hills forged the economic backbone of the community until the 1920s. Joelton contains several historic rural properties. Small farms line Whites Creek Pike in the northern section of the area. Many feature bungalows as farm houses—an indication of the widespread rural popularity of this house type better known for its suburban examples. Joelton was served by a separate utility district until 1974. Councilman Guy Bates was instrumental in bringing Metro services into Joelton. A fire hall in 1978, paved road and street lights, and other amenities. However, the community struggled when its high school closed in 1980."

Education
A middle school and elementary school are located in Joelton. Local high school students are zone to attend either nearby Whites Creek High School in the Metropolitan Nashville school district or Sycamore Middle School and Sycamore High School in Pleasant View. Joelton High School closed its doors in 1980.

Government
As a part of Metro Nashville, Joelton is represented by one Metro Council member. Residents vote in mayoral and other city elections. Nashville city services are provided on a limited basis. The general services area includes city water, street maintenance and fire and police service. Garbage pickup is not included. A fire station is located in the heart of Joelton, maintained by Metro Nashville, the portion in Cheatham County is represented by the Cheatham County Commission.

In popular culture
The music video for country music artist Miranda Lambert's "Only Prettier" was filmed in Joelton in June 2010, at the Middle School.

Riders in the Sky have a song, "The Salting of the Slug" from the album The Cowboy Way, that is set in Joelton.

ZIP codes
The city's ZIP code is 37080.

Area codes
615 is the area code for Joelton.

See also
Walden's Puddle

References

External links
Nashville Next report by Metro Nashville Government

Populated places in Davidson County, Tennessee
Neighborhoods in Nashville, Tennessee